The Sarania Kachari is an ethnic community in the state of Assam, Northeast India. Members of this community are mostly found in the districts of Kamrup (Metro), Kamrup (Rural), Nalbari, Baksa, Udalguri, Darrang, Barpeta, Dhemaji and Bongaigoan. Sarania (also called saru-koch)  is a category in the tribe-caste continuum of Assamese society. This category is also known as Phairi in the Nowgong district of Assam. In this category, a tribal neophyte starts giving up on habits such as the drinking of liquor. Scholars have identified an instance of this process taking place in Boroma area in the erstwhile Nalbari district in the late 19th century, where a section of Boro population were assimilated into the Assamese society. The notable surnames used by the community are Sarania, Das, Deka, Choudhury, Medhi, Hazarika etc.

Notes

References

Printed sources

See also
Boro people
Assamese people
Bodo-Kachari people

Scheduled Tribes of India
Bodo-Kachari
Social groups of Assam
Ethnic groups in Northeast India
Ethnic groups in South Asia